Asteras Vlachioti Football Club is a Greek professional football club based in Vlachiotis, Laconia, Greece. The team currently competes in the Gamma Ethniki, the third tier of Greek football.

History
Asteras Vlachioti was founded in 1950 and competed in the Laconia EPS Championships. They won the Laconia Championship for the first time in 1996 and in the five-year period 1996-2001, they competed in the 4th National. In 2016-17, Asteras won the second Laconia Championship and won for the first time in its history the rise to the 3rd National.

Honours

Domestic
  Fourth Division Champions: 1
 2019–20
  Laconia FCA Champions: 2
 1995–96, 2016–17
  Laconia FCA Cup Winners: 1
 2016–17

Players

Current squad

References

Laconia
Association football clubs established in 1950
1950 establishments in Greece
Super League Greece 2 clubs